{{DISPLAYTITLE:C8H7NS}}
The molecular formula C8H7NS (molar mass: 149.21 g/mol, exact mass: 149.0299 u) may refer to:

 Benzyl isothiocyanate (BITC)
 Benzothiazine
 2-Mercaptoindole

Molecular formulas